Take Diversion is a 2022 Indian Tamil-language comedy film directed by Sivaani Senthil and starring Sivakumar, Padine Kumar, Ramachandran Durairaj and John Vijay. It was released on 20 May 2022.

Cast

Production
The film marked the second venture of director Sivaani Senthil after Kargil (2018). The shoot began in March 2021 with several new actors cast alongside Ramachandran Durairaj, John Vijay and George Vijay. Sivakumar from Koothu-P-Pattarai and television actress Padine Kumar were signed to play the lead roles. Production continued through March and April 2021. A song titled ‘Masthana Mass Minoru’ sung by Deva, with choreography and performance by Sandy, was released in late 2021. A promotional event was held in May 2022 prior to release, with the director noting that K. S. Ravikumar and Prashanth Neel applauded the trailer.

Reception
The film was released on 20 May 2022 across Tamil Nadu. A critic from ChennaiVision gave the film a mixed review, noting "the initial stages were enjoyable and then there is a slight slag. However, the second half is good." Critic Malini Mannath wrote "the film works in parts, the genuine fun moments few and far between", adding "what may have seemed amusing on paper seems to have lost some of its punch and fizz while being transitioned to screen". A critic from Thangam TV noted the film had "little plot".

References

2022 films
2022 drama films
Indian drama films
2020s Tamil-language films